There have been multiple military invasions of the Netherlands or its predecessor states, including:

 The Capture of Brielle by the Watergeuzen (1572), during the Dutch Revolt
 The Franco-Dutch War (1672–78), during which France and Munster occupied much of the Netherlands
 Prussian invasion of Holland (1787), during the Batavian Revolution
 The culmination of the Flanders Campaign (1794–95), invasion by France during the War of the First Coalition
 Anglo-Russian invasion of Holland (1799), during the War of the Second Coalition
 German invasion of the Netherlands (1940), during the Second World War